The siege of Panormus was a Byzantine siege of the Ostrogothic fortified city of Panormus (modern Palermo) in late 535, during the Gothic War (535–554). A Byzantine army of 7,500–9,000 and a fleet, both under the command of general Belisarius, laid siege to the city, which refused to surrender unlike all the other Ostrogothic-held cities in Sicily. Belisarius ordered his fleet to sail into the harbor and anchor beside the wall. Small boats filled with archers were hoisted on top of the ships' masts, which surpassed the height of the parapet. The fire from the archers convinced the Ostrogoths to surrender, completing the conquest of Sicily.

Prelude
Upon the beginning of the Gothic War (535–554), a Byzantine army of 7,500–9,000 men under Belisarius, supported by a fleet, landed in Sicily and took over Catania with little trouble. He made the city his headquarters and moved onto Syracuse, which also fell without a fight. Belisarius' army and fleet then advanced on Panormus.

Siege
The Ostrogoth garrison at Panormus was confident behind the protection of its walls and refused summons to surrender. Belisarius considered a land-based siege impossible and ordered his fleet to sail into the city harbor, which was right next to the walls but outside them and without Ostrogoth guards. The masts of the Byzantine ships were higher than the parapet and Belisarius ordered small boats filled with archers to be hoisted on top of the masts. The fire from above from the Byzantine archers threw the Ostrogothic garrison into panic and convinced them to surrender.

Aftermath
All of Sicily was now under Byzantine control. Belisarius made a triumphal entry to Syracuse on 31 December 535, the last day of his consulship.

Citations

Bibliography
 

530s conflicts
Military history of Sicily
Panormus 535
Panormus 535
Battles in Sicily
Gothic War (535–554)
530s in the Byzantine Empire
535
History of Palermo